The J. M. McClintock House is a historic house at 43 Magnolia Street in Marianna, Arkansas.  It is a -story wood-frame structure, designed by Charles L. Thompson and built in 1912, whose Craftsman/Bungalow styling is in marked contrast to the W.S. McClintock House, a Colonial Revival structure designed by Thompson for another member of the McClintock family and built the same year.  This house has the broad sweeping roof line with exposed rafters covering a porch supported by brick piers and paired wooden box posts on either side of the centered stair.  A dormer with clipped-gable roof is centered above the entry.

The house was listed on the National Register of Historic Places in 1982.

See also
W. S. McClintock House, at 83 Main St., also designed by Thompson and NRHP-listed
National Register of Historic Places listings in Lee County, Arkansas

References

Houses on the National Register of Historic Places in Arkansas
Houses completed in 1912
Houses in Lee County, Arkansas
1912 establishments in Arkansas
National Register of Historic Places in Lee County, Arkansas